Ahmed Douhou (born 14 December 1976 in Bouake) is a French sprinter who specializes in the 200 metres. He switched nationality from his birth country Côte d'Ivoire in 2002.

He won the bronze medal in 4 x 400 metres relay at the 2002 European Championships, together with teammates Leslie Djhone, Naman Keïta and Ibrahima Wade. On the individual level he reached the semifinals of the 1997 IAAF World Indoor Championships, and participated at the 2000 and 2004 Summer Olympics.

Before switching to France he helped set a Côte d'Ivoire record in 4 x 100 metres relay of 38.60 seconds, achieved with teammates Ibrahim Meité, Yves Sonan and Eric Pacome N'Dri at the 2001 World Championships in Edmonton.

Personal bests
100 metres - 10.36 s (2000)
200 metres - 20.90 s (2000)
400 metres - 45.86 s (2004)
400 metres hurdles - 55.97 s (1994)

References

External links

1976 births
Living people
French male sprinters
Ivorian male sprinters
French sportspeople of Ivorian descent
People from Bouaké
Athletes (track and field) at the 1996 Summer Olympics
Mediterranean Games medalists in athletics
Athletes (track and field) at the 2000 Summer Olympics
Athletes (track and field) at the 2004 Summer Olympics
Olympic athletes of Ivory Coast
Olympic athletes of France
European Athletics Championships medalists
World Athletics Championships athletes for France
World Athletics Championships athletes for Ivory Coast
Mediterranean Games silver medalists for France
Athletes (track and field) at the 2005 Mediterranean Games
World Athletics Championships winners